George Henry Walder was an American football player and coach. He served as the head football coach at his alma mater, Cornell University, in 1909. Walder was a standout player at Cornell, playing as a halfback, fullback.

Head coaching record

References

Year of birth missing
Year of death missing
American football fullbacks
American football halfbacks
Cornell Big Red football coaches
Cornell Big Red football players